The esterling is an obsolete Belgian unit of mass.
 1 esterling = 1/20 ounce

References
 Kaltschmidt, J. H. Neuestes und vollständigstes Fremdwörterbuch zur Erklärung aller aus fremden Sprachen entlehnten Wörter und Ausdrücke. F. A. Brockhaus, 1870, p. 346.

Obsolete units of measurement
Units of mass